The Embassy of Russia in Damascus is the diplomatic mission of the Russian Federation to the Syrian Arab Republic. The chancery is located in Omar Ben Al-Khattab Street in Adawi, Damascus.

The USSR Embassy in Damascus opened in February 1946. In January 1992, with the fall of the Soviet Union, it became the de facto embassy of the Russian Federation.

Attacks
On 21 February 2013, the embassy was attacked as part of a bombing campaign in Damascus. On 28 December 2016, a mortar round landed in the Embassy's courtyard but did not explode.

Ambassadors of Russia to Syria

 Aleksandr Zotov (26 December 1992 to 13 September 1994)
 Viktor Gogitidze (13 September 1994 to 31 August 1999)
 Robert Markaryan (31 August 1999 to 10 November 2006)
 Sergei Kirpichenko (1 December 2006 to 7 September 2011)
 Azamat Kulmuhametov (7 September 2011 to 22 December 2014)
 Alexander Kinshchak (22 December 2014 to 29 October 2018)
  Aleksandr Yefimov (29 October 2018 to present)

See also
 Russia–Syria relations

References

External links
  Embassy of Russia in Syria

Russia–Syria relations
Russia
Damascus
Soviet Union–Syria relations